Menuet is a 1982 Belgian-Dutch drama film directed by Lili Rademakers. The film was selected as the Belgian entry for the Best Foreign Language Film at the 55th Academy Awards, but was not accepted as a nominee.

Cast

See also
 List of submissions to the 55th Academy Awards for Best Foreign Language Film
 List of Belgian submissions for the Academy Award for Best Foreign Language Film

References

External links
 

1982 films
1982 drama films
Dutch drama films
1980s Dutch-language films
Belgian drama films